The Omaha Nighthawks were a professional American football team based in Omaha, Nebraska, which played in the United Football League, joining the league as an expansion team in 2010. During their first season, the Nighthawks played their home games at Johnny Rosenblatt Stadium before moving to TD Ameritrade Park Omaha for 2011 and beyond. Zach Nelson, CEO of Internet software provider NetSuite, was announced as lead owner in August 2010.

Franchise history

2010 season

On April 15, 2010, Omaha was granted an expansion team in the UFL, with former Boston College coach Jeff Jagodzinski being named the team's head coach. The team allowed fans to name the new team by either writing in a name or choosing from a preselected list (Mustangs, Spirit, Navigators or Stags). The Nighthawks name was officially unveiled on May 5, 2010 and won based on a strong write-in campaign. It was partially derived from the Lockheed F-117 Nighthawk, the retired stealth fighter used in the United States Air Force.

On September 21, the Tuesday before the team's first ever game, it was announced that a sellout crowd of 24,000 tickets were sold for the first time in UFL history, to watch the Nighthawks take on the Colonials in the franchise's first ever game. Omaha defeated the Colonials, 27–26.

On November 19, the Omaha Nighthawks played Florida in the UFL's first alternate uniform: a camouflage jersey was worn in honor of the Armed Forces.

On January 3, 2011, Jagodzinski was fired by the Nighthawks. Omaha chose to not renew his contract for the 2011 season as he led the Nighthawks to four straight losses to close out the season at 3–5, tied for last place in the league for 2010. Just nine days later, Joe Moglia was named team president and head coach. He was previously announced as the head coach for the expansion Virginia Destroyers.

Schedule

2011 season

Schedule

2012 season

Moglia departed the head coaching position with the Nighthawks in December 2011 to take the head coaching position at Coastal Carolina University, taking much of his staff with him. General manager Rick Mueller departed for the Philadelphia Eagles in January 2012.

Bart Andrus, former head coach of the NFL Europe Amsterdam Admirals, longtime NFL assistant and Moglia's offensive coordinator during the 2011 season, assumed the title of head coach and general manager on August 9, 2012.

For the 2012 season, all UFL games were slated to be broadcast by CBS Sports Network.

On October 20, 2012 the United Football League announced it would suspend all operations and intended on resuming the canceled schedule some time in spring 2013, with those games counting toward the 2012 season standings.  The league never resumed in spring of 2013.  In March 2013, 78 players filed suit against the league.

Schedule

Season-by-season records

Records vs. teams

This includes postseason games.

Home, away and neutral records

References

External links
 Omaha Nighthawks

 
2010 establishments in Nebraska
2012 disestablishments in Nebraska